This is a list of airlines which have an air operator's certificate issued by the Civil Aviation Authority  of Albania.

Scheduled airlines

See also 
 List of airlines
 List of defunct airlines of Albania

References 

 
Airlines
Albania
Airlines
Albania